Wang Shiyue (born April 21, 1994) is a Chinese ice dancer. With her skating partner, Liu Xinyu, she is the 2017 Asian Winter Games champion, 2018 CS Asian Open champion, 2015 Toruń Cup champion, and four-time Chinese national champions (2015, 2018, 2019, 2020). They have competed in the final segment at four World Championships.

Wang/Liu have competed at both the 2018 Winter Olympics and the 2022 Winter Olympics, where they finished 22nd and 12th, respectively.

Programs 
(with Liu)

Competitive highlights 
GP: Grand Prix; CS: Challenger Series

With Liu

References

External links 

 
  

1994 births
Chinese female ice dancers
Figure skaters at the 2017 Asian Winter Games
Medalists at the 2017 Asian Winter Games
Asian Games gold medalists for China
Asian Games medalists in figure skating
Living people
Figure skaters from Changchun
Figure skaters at the 2018 Winter Olympics
Figure skaters at the 2022 Winter Olympics
Olympic figure skaters of China
Competitors at the 2013 Winter Universiade